Vicente Pérez Rosales (5 April 1807 – 6 September 1886) was a politician, traveller, merchant, miner and Chilean diplomat that organised the colonisation by Germans and Chileans of the Llanquihue area. Vicente Pérez Rosales National Park is named after him.

See also
Carlos Anwandter
Chan Chan (forest)
Bernhard Eunom Philippi
German colonization of Valdivia, Osorno and Llanquihue

Sources
Memoria chilena

1807 births
1886 deaths
People from Santiago
Chilean people of Cantabrian descent
Chilean people of Spanish descent
National Party (Chile, 1857) politicians
Presidents of the Chamber of Deputies of Chile
Deputies of the XIII Legislative Period of the National Congress of Chile
Senators of the XVIII Legislative Period of the National Congress of Chile
Senators of the XIX Legislative Period of the National Congress of Chile
Chilean diplomats
Chilean memoirists
19th-century memoirists
People of the California Gold Rush